The 2010 ICC World Twenty20 was the third Men's T20 World Cup  competition, an international Twenty20 cricket tournament that was held in the West Indies between 30 April and 16 May 2010. It was won by England, who defeated Australia in the final. Kevin Pietersen was named as player of the tournament.

Although the tournament was held every two years beginning in 2007, the scheduled ICC Champions Trophy, One Day International tournament to be held in the West Indies in 2010 was revised to a Twenty20 format because the 2008 Champions Trophy tournament in Pakistan was postponed due to security concerns and there was a need to correct the international cricketing tournament calendar.

This ICC World Twenty20 took place only 10 months after the last one. As before, the tournament featured 12 teams – the Test-playing nations and two qualifiers. Matches were played at three grounds – Kensington Oval in Bridgetown, Barbados; Providence Stadium in Providence, Guyana; and Beausejour Stadium in Gros Islet, Saint Lucia. The tournament was organised in parallel with the women's tournament, with the men's semi-finals and final each being preceded by the semi-finals and final from the women's event.

This competition also saw Afghanistan make their first ever appearance in a major ICC international cricket tournament, and was made even more remarkable as at the time they only held Affiliate Membership and subsequently became the only Affiliate member ever to compete in a major ICC international cricket tournament.

Qualification 

The ICC World Twenty20 qualifier was won by Afghanistan who defeated Ireland by 8 wickets in the final with both sides qualifying for the 2010 ICC World Twenty20. This was the first major tournament Afghanistan qualified for, while leading associates the Netherlands and Scotland failed to qualify this time.

Venues 
All matches were played at the following three grounds:

Rules and regulations 
During the group stage and Super Eight, points are awarded to the teams as follows:

In case of a tie (i.e. both teams score exactly the same number of runs at the end of their respective innings), a Super Over decides the winner. This is applicable in all stages of the tournament.

Within each group (of both group and Super Eight stages), teams are ranked against each other based on the following criteria:

 Higher number of points
 If equal, higher number of wins
 If still equal, higher net run rate
 If still equal, lower bowling strike rate
 If still equal, result of head-to-head meeting.

Groups 
The groups were announced on 4 July 2009. The initial four group format is the same as that used at the 2009 tournament. Team seed in brackets.

Group A
 (1)
 (9)
 (10)

Group B
 (2)
 (5)

Group C
 (3)
 (7)

Group D
 (4)
 (6)

Notes
 Afghanistan and Ireland qualified via the 2010 ICC World Twenty20 Qualifier.
 As Zimbabwe withdrew from the 2009 competition, they failed to achieve a seed for the 2010 competition.
 As Ireland reached the Super Eight stage of the 2009 competition, they would have been the eighth seed if they were a Test-playing nation. Therefore, an eighth seed is missing from the competition.

Squads

Warm-up matches

Group stage

Group A

Group B

Group C

Group D

Super 8s 
The Super 8s stage consists of the top two teams from each group of the group stage. The teams are split into two groups, Groups E and F. Group E will consist of the top seed from Groups A and C, and the second seed of groups B and D. Group F will consist of the top seed from Groups B and D, and the second seed of groups A and C. The seedings used are those allocated at the start of the tournament and are not affected by group stage results, with the exception of if a non-seeded team knocks out a seeded team, the non-seeded team inherits the seed of the knocked-out team.

Group E

Group F

Knockout stage

Semi-finals

Final 

The final, played in Barbados on 16 May 2010, featured the game's oldest rivalry less than six months before the Ashes in Australia. England won by seven wickets with three overs to spare to seal its first International Cricket Council world championship after losses in three World Cup finals – 1979 against the West Indies at Lord's, 1987 against Australia and 1992 against Pakistan – and a loss in the 2004 Champions Trophy final to the West Indies on home soil. Australia batted first and scored 147 runs for the loss of six wickets, with David Hussey's top score of 59 proving crucial after England had reduced the Aussies to 8/3 after 2.1 overs and then removed captain Michael Clarke. England bettered Australia's total with 18 balls to spare, reaching 148 runs for the loss of three wickets, with Craig Kieswetter (63 runs) and Kevin Pietersen (47 runs) combining for a 111-run partnership for the second wicket before captain Paul Collingwood hit the winning run. Pietersen was subsequently named Man of the Tournament having scored 248 runs, while Kieswetter was named Man of the Match having scored his first T20 international half-century in the final.

Media coverage

Television

Radio

Internet

References

External links 
 ICC World Twenty20 Cricket – Yahoo!
 Tournament page on Cricinfo

 
2010 in West Indian cricket
ICC Men's T20 World Cup
World Twenty20